Berkshire Mall can refer to the following:
Berkshire Mall (Massachusetts) 
Berkshire Mall (Pennsylvania)